Søre Randberget is a mountain in Sørkapp Land at Spitsbergen, Svalbard. It has a height of 186 m.a.s.l., and is located north of Randbreen.

References

Mountains of Spitsbergen